de Maistre (also Demaistre, deMaistre) is a surname.

People with this name include:

 Gilles de Maistre (born 1960), French screenwriter
 Henriette-Marie de Sainte-Marie Baronne Almaury de Maistre (1809-1875), French composer
 Joseph de Maistre (1753–1821), Savoyard jurist & political conservative
 Roy De Maistre (1894–1968), Australian artist
 Rodolphe de Maistre (1789-1866), French military man
 Xavier de Maistre (1763–1852), French military man and writer
 Xavier de Maistre (harpist) (born 1973), French harpist

See also

 
 
 Le Maistre (surname)
 Maistre (surname)